John Bright (1908–1995) was an American biblical scholar, the author of several books including the influential A History of Israel (1959), currently in its fourth edition (2000). He was closely associated with the American school of biblical criticism pioneered by William F. Albright, which sought to marry archaeology to a defence of the reliability of the Bible, especially the earlier books of the Old Testament.

Biography

Born on September 25, 1908, in Chattanooga, Tennessee,  and attended Presbyterian College where he earned his Bachelor of Arts degree in 1928. He received a Bachelor of Divinity degree from Union Theological Seminary in Virginia in 1931, followed by a Master of Theology degree in 1933. His master's thesis was titled A Psychological Study of the Major Prophets. In the winter of 1931–32, Bright participated in an archaeological campaign at Tell Beit Mirsim, where he met the renowned William Foxwell Albright of Johns Hopkins University, who became his mentor. He also participated in a dig at Bethel in 1935. In the autumn of that year he studied under Albright at Johns Hopkins University but dropped out later due to insufficient funds to continue his studies, and took a position as the assistant pastor of First Presbyterian Church in Durham, North Carolina, which did not last long. He was able to resume his studies at Johns Hopkins while he was the pastor of Catonsville Presbyterian Church in Baltimore, and completed his doctoral degree in 1940. His dissertation was titled The Age of King David: A Study in the Institutional History of Israel. He then went back to Union Theological Seminary where he was appointed to the Cyrus H. McCormick Chair of Hebrew and Old Testament Interpretation, a position he held until his retirement in 1975. He died in Richmond, Virginia, on March 26, 1995.

Influence and legacy 

Bright's work A History of Israel was published in 1959, with a second and third edition in 1972 and 1981. The second edition (1972) included new information from the Adad-nirari III stele of Tell al-Rimah, published in 1968, and the Hebrew ostracon found at Mesad Hashavyahu, published in 1962. His third edition (1981) included a thorough revision of the first four chapters. While including new data, Bright maintained his theological conviction that "the heart of Israel's faith lies in its covenantal relationship with YHWH."

In an appendix to the fourth edition (2000) of Bright's work, William P. Brown outlined some of the changes in the field of historical research since the third edition. Brown notes:

Published works
 The Age of King David: A Study in the Institutional History of Israel (doctoral dissertation 1940) (Union Seminary Review, 53 [1942] pp. 87–109).
 The Kingdom of God: The Biblical Concept and Its Meaning for the Church (New York/Nashville: Abingdon-Cokesbury, 1953)
 Early Israel in Recent History Writing (Westminster, 1956)
 A History of Israel (Westminster, 1959)
 Jeremiah: A Commentary (Anchor Bible 21: Garden City, New York: Doubleday, 1965).
 The Authority of the Old Testament (Baker, 1975)
 Covenant and Promise: The Prophetic Understanding of the Future in Pre-Exilic Israel (Philadelphia: Westminster, 1976).

See also

 Biblical archaeology

References

Footnotes

Bibliography

 
 
 

1908 births
1995 deaths
20th-century American male writers
20th-century American non-fiction writers
20th-century Christian biblical scholars
20th-century Presbyterian ministers
Academics from Tennessee
American biblical scholars
American male non-fiction writers
Calvinist and Reformed biblical scholars
Johns Hopkins University alumni
Old Testament scholars
People from Chattanooga, Tennessee
Presbyterian Church in the United States ministers
Presbyterian College alumni
Presbyterians from Tennessee
Presbyterians from Virginia
Religious leaders from Tennessee
Religious leaders from Virginia
Union Presbyterian Seminary alumni
Union Presbyterian Seminary faculty
20th-century American clergy